Hamer Hall (formerly the Melbourne Concert Hall) is a 2,466 seat concert hall, the largest indoor venue at Arts Centre Melbourne, used for orchestra and contemporary music performances. It was designed by Roy Grounds as part of the Cultural Centre that comprised the National Gallery of Victoria and the Arts Centre Melbourne. It was opened as the 'Melbourne Concert Hall' in 1982 (the Theatres Building opened in 1984) and was renamed Hamer Hall in honour of Rupert Hamer (the 39th Premier of Victoria) shortly after his death in 2004.

2010 redevelopment
Construction on the A$136-million inside-out redevelopment of Hamer Hall was due to begin in 2010. The venue's redevelopment is the first stage of the Southbank Cultural Precinct Redevelopment and was delivered through an alliance between Arts Victoria, Major Projects Victoria, the Arts Centre, Ashton Raggatt McDougall and Baulderstone. The redevelopment included a new outlook to the city and new connections to central Melbourne, St Kilda Road and the Yarra River, new and expanded foyer spaces, improved amenities, new stairs, improved disability access, escalators and lifts as well as improved acoustics, new auditorium seating and staging systems.

The Hall was re-opened on 26 July 2012 with a Hamer Hall Opening Concert, featuring Caroline O’Connor, k.d. lang, Eddie Perfect and Lior with live orchestra.

Awards and nominations

Music Victoria Awards
The Music Victoria Awards are an annual awards night celebrating Victorian music. They commenced in 2006. The award for Best Venue was introduced in 2016.

! 
|-
| Music Victoria Awards of 2018
| Hamer Hall, Melbourne
| Best Venue (Over 500 Capacity)
| 
|rowspan="3"| 
|-
| Music Victoria Awards of 2019
| Hamer Hall, Melbourne
| Best Venue (Over 500 Capacity)
| 
|-
| Music Victoria Awards of 2020
| Hamer Hall, Melbourne
| Best Venue (Over 500 Capacity)
| 
|-
| 2021 Music Victoria Awards
| Hamer Hall, Melbourne
| Best Venue (Over 500 Capacity)
| 
| 
|-

See also
Donald Laycock, Australian artist who painted the interior of Hamer Hall

References 

Music venues in Melbourne
Concert halls in Australia
Music venues completed in 1982
1982 establishments in Australia
Landmarks in Melbourne
Buildings and structures in the City of Melbourne (LGA)
Southbank, Victoria